The Indochinese Communist Party (ICP) was a political party which was transformed from the old Vietnamese Communist Party (Vietnamese: Việt Nam Cộng sản Đảng) in October 1930. This party dissolved itself on 11 November 1945.

Background 
The Vietnamese Communist Party was founded on 3 February 1930 by uniting the Communist Party of Indochina (despite its name, this party was active only in Tonkin) and the Communist Party of Annam (active only in Cochinchina). Thereafter, the Communist League of Indochina (active only in central Annam) joined the Vietnamese Communist Party. However, the Comintern argued that the communist movement should be promoted in the whole of French Indochina (including Cambodia, Laos and Vietnam) rather than only in Vietnam, therefore it urged the Vietnamese Communist Party to transform itself into the Indochinese Communist Party. The Communist International had a substantial degree of control both over the party's policies and over the composition of its leadership in return of financial aid.

The League for National Salvation of Vietnamese Residents of Kampuchea was a pro-Viet Minh movement of Vietnamese inhabitants in Cambodia.

The organization emerged from a network of revolutionary committees formed among Vietnamese residents in the border areas of Cambodia towards the end of 1946. Such groups had emerged in places like Takéo Province, Prey Veng Province and southern Kandal Province. The League for National Salvation of Vietnamese Residents of Kampuchea was set up as a front organization of the Indochinese Communist Party in March 1947, merging the various local revolutionary committees. One of the first Viet Minh documents captured by the French in Cambodia was dated 30 April 1949 and revealed the existence of the League, as well as detailing a proposed Vietnamese-Khmer alliance against the French.

In 1950, Vietnamese sources claimed the organization had a membership of 50,000.

Transformation 
In a resolution issued by the Vietnamese Communist Party in October 1930, the party criticized its own regulations and party name, with the resolution stating: "When naming the party "Vietnamese Communist Party", it implies that Cambodia and Laos are not concerned. Excluding these countries is a wrong thing because Annam, Cambodia and Laos should closely contact each other in terms of politics and economics even though they do not share a language, custom, and ethic". The party resolved "to give up the name "Vietnamese Communist Party" and to take the new name "Indochinese Communist Party".

Later, the ICP issued a statement to explain the reason for changing its name. Noting the historical relationship between Vietnam, Laos and Cambodia, the flyer emphasized the need of a union of three countries to overthrow the French colonial regime in Indochina.

Party activity program  
The party program of action was based on 10 points:
 To overthrow French imperialism, Vietnamese feudalism and reactionary bourgeoisie;
 To make Indochina completely independent;
 To establish a worker-peasant-soldier government;
 To confiscate banks and other enterprises belonging to the imperialists and put them under the control of the worker-peasant-soldier government;
 To confiscate all the plantations and property belonging to the imperialists and the reactionary bourgeoisie and distribute them to the poor;
 To implement eight-hour working days;
 To abolish the forced buying of government bonds, the poll tax and all unjust taxes that the poor has to pay;
 To bring democratic freedoms to the masses;
 To dispense education to all the people; and
 To realize equality between men and women.

Dissolution 
On 11 November 1945, the Indochinese Communist Party issued a communique to dissolve itself. Later in 1951, the Vietnamese members of the party founded the Workers' Party of Vietnam and Cambodian members founded the Kampuchean People's Revolutionary Party (now Cambodian People's Party). Four years later, Laotian members of the party founded the Lao People's Party.

See also 
 History of the Communist Party of Vietnam

Notes

References 

Indochina
Communist parties in Vietnam
Defunct political parties in Vietnam
History of the Communist Party of Vietnam